The tennis competitions at the 2018 Mediterranean Games in Tarragona will take place between 26 June and 30 June at the Tarragona Tennis Club. 
Athletes will compete in 4 events.

Medal table

Medalists

References

External links
2018 Mediterranean Games – Tennis

 
Sports at the 2018 Mediterranean Games
2018
Mediterranean Games